Holosiivska Square is one of the squares of Kyiv, Ukraine.

Located in the historical area Demiivka (southern Kyiv), emerged in the XIXth century and till 1961 was unnamed when it has received current name. 

The square is an intersection of the streets Holosiivska, Vasylkivska and Maxima Rylskoho and avenue Holosiivskyi on the road from downtown to Odessa. 

The station Holosiivska of Kyiv Metro was opened on the square in 2010.

References

Sources 
 Holosiivska Square on wek.kiev.ua (in Ukrainian)
 Голосіївська пл. // Вулиці Києва. Довідник / упоряд. А. М. Сигалов та ін. — К. : Реклама, 1975. — С. 47. (in Ukrainian)

Holosiivskyi District
Squares in Kyiv